Rote Kapelle were a post-punk/indie pop band from Edinburgh, Scotland, active during the 1980s. Its band members included musicians who were also members of Jesse Garon and the Desperadoes and The Shop Assistants.

History
The band was formed in the early 1980s by Andrew Tully (vocals) and Marguerite Vasquez-Ponte (vocals), both of whom would also form Jesse Garon and the Desperadoes, with Chris Henman (guitar), Ian Binns (keyboards, also a member of The Stayrcase), Malcolm Kergan (bass, also a member of The Thanes), and Jonathan Muir (drums). The band's debut release was The Big Smell Dinosaur EP in late 1985, after which they were signed by Marc Riley's In-Tape label. Tully described the band's sound in 1987 as a blend of noisy post-punk and anorak pop. Vasquez-Ponte was also a member of a third band, The Fizzbombs, alongside the Desperadoes' Angus McPake and The Shop Assistants' former drummer Ann Donald. They released two further singles and two more EP's, one of which featured tracks from their Peel Session, before splitting when Vasquez-Ponte joined the re-formed Shop Assistants. An LP, No North Briton, was released in 1990.

Discography
The Big Smell Dinosaur 7-inch EP (1985) Big Smell Dinosaur
"These Animals are Dangeroos" 7-inch (1986) In-Tape
It Moves But Does It Swing? 12-inch EP (John Peel Sessions) EP (1987) In-Tape
"Fire Escape" 7-inch (1988) In-Tape
San Francisco Again 12-inch EP (1988) In-Tape
No North Briton LP (1990) In-Tape

References

External links
Rote Kapelle Peel Session details at the BBC's Keeping It Peel site
Rote Kapelle at Last.fm
Rote Kapelle at discogs.com

Scottish rock music groups
British indie pop groups